The 17th Lux Style Awards ceremony was held in Expo Center in Lahore, Pakistan. The award show not only recognized and acknowledged excellence in Fashion, Film, Music and TV but also created consciousness about various social causes, such as sexual abuse, child abuse and human rights. Unilever Pakistan Marketing Director Raheel Pasha also issued a statement earlier saying that 17th Lux Style Awards show was going to bring focus on ‘social awakening’ and ‘stand in solidarity with the nation’ at this ‘critical time’. The event started off with celebrities and prominent personalities walking down the red carpet. Ali Kazmi, the official Red Carpet host engaged the stars in quick and light hearted conversations after visiting the Social Corner, which was hosted by Ayesha Omer. Punjab Nahi Jaungi remained most awards winning film with four awards while Baaghi remained most awards winning TV series by winning three awards.

The Awards show was directed By Vaneeza Ahmad and the development was said to be occurred because of budget cuts for the show. The opening and closing was executed by Frieha Altaf where she also launched the #MeinBhi campaign which aimed to aimed to cover several human rights violations.

Winners and Nominees 
The nominees for the 17th Lux Style Awards were announced in January 2018.

Here’s who won at 17th Lux Style Awards. Winners are listed first in boldface

Film

Music

Television

Fashion

Best Dressed Male 

 Abrar Ul Haq

Best Dressed Female 

 Nabila

Lifetime Achievement Award 

 Frieha Altaf received the Lifetime Achievement Award.

References 

Lux Style Awards ceremonies
2017 film awards